George Harry Scadgell known as John Scadgell (1912-2002) was an England international lawn bowler.

Bowls career
He won a gold medal in the fours at the 1958 British Empire and Commonwealth Games in Cardiff with Norman King, John Bettles and Walter Phillips.

He won three National Championship titles, two in the pairs (1955 and 1966) and once in the fours (1961).

Personal life
He and his father H G (George) Scadgell both bowled for Worthing and ran a House and hotel furnishing company.

References

1912 births
2002 deaths
English male bowls players
Commonwealth Games medallists in lawn bowls
Commonwealth Games gold medallists for England
Bowls players at the 1958 British Empire and Commonwealth Games
Medallists at the 1958 British Empire and Commonwealth Games